All American Speedway is a 1/3-mile NASCAR-sanctioned paved oval racetrack located in Roseville, California, United States.

The track first began operations in 1954. The track was originally a quarter mile long, but was renovated before the 2008 racing season to its current length of one third of a mile.

Between the years 1977 and 1982, five NASCAR Winston Grand National West Series events were held at the track. Since the renovation prior to the 2008 season, sixteen more ARCA Menards Series West races have been held at the track. The venue also hosts an annual round of the SRL Southwest Tour.

References

External links
 Track Website
 

NASCAR tracks
Sports venues in Placer County, California
Tourist attractions in Placer County, California
Motorsport venues in California
Buildings and structures in Roseville, California